InteliSpend Prepaid Solutions is a private company formed as a joint venture by American Express and Maritz, Inc in 1997. InteliSpend provides incentive programs for 76% of Fortune 500 companies. In 2010, Maritz bought out American Express' interest in the company to obtain 100% ownership.

Products

Card Programs 
One of the primary selling points for InteliSpend is the patented DirectSpend technology that gives clients the ability to restrict the spending on the reward cards to specific retail locations. Through the Persona product InteliSpend's clients are able to choose which retail outlets the card will be accepted at. Additionally cards can be co-branded and personalized through the Custom Card and DirectSpend/Persona products. For non-restricted programs the Encompass card is provided.

Sales Incentive & Rebate Programs 

In addition to pure card solutions InteliSpend utilizes partner companies to provide Sales Incentive (Spiff) programs and product rebate programs. Through its partners InteliSpend delivers online solutions with varying degrees of integration and online facilities.

Management and Key Executives
Key executives include:
 Darryl A. Hutson: Chief Executive Officer
 Russell W. T. Yergensen: Chief Financial Officer

References

External links

 Official website

Credit cards
Payment systems
Companies based in Missouri
Financial services companies established in 1997